The Red and the Black is a novel by Stendhal.

The Red and the Black may also refer to:
 The Red and the Black (1954 film), a French film
 The Red and the Black (1985 film), a Croatian film
 "The Red and the Black", a 1973 song by Blue Öyster Cult from the album Tyranny and Mutation
 "The Red and the Black", a 2015 song by Iron Maiden from the album The Book of Souls
 The Red and the Black (album), the 1981 LP from Jerry Harrison of Talking Heads
 "The Red and the Black" (The X-Files), a 1998 episode from The X-Files

See also 
 Red and Black (disambiguation)
 The Scarlet and the Black (disambiguation)